Petros Topouzis (born 12 July 1991) is a Greek footballer who currently plays for A.O. Pefki.

References

External links
 
 Onsports.gr profile 

1991 births
Living people
Doxa Drama F.C. players
Veria F.C. players
PAS Giannina F.C. players
Super League Greece players
Greek footballers
Greek expatriate footballers
Association football forwards
Footballers from Katerini